David Wotherspoon (9 April 1849 – 28 February 1906) was a Scottish footballer who played as a defender.

Early and personal life
He was born on 9 April 1849 in Hamilton, South Lanarkshire, son of William Wotherspoon, a baker, and Mary Hamilton. He married Mary Galbraith in 1876 and had five daughters.

Wotherspoon died of tuberculosis on 28 February 1906 in Pollokshields, Glasgow.

Career
Wotherspoon played club football for Queen's Park and Clydesdale, and made two appearances for Scotland. He also served as a committee member and club secretary at Queen's Park. He has been credited with the introduction of Queen's Park's black and white hooped kit design.

He made one official competitive appearance for Queen's Park, in the English FA Cup.

References

1849 births
1906 deaths
Scottish footballers
Scotland international footballers
Queen's Park F.C. players
Clydesdale F.C. players
Association football defenders
Footballers from Hamilton, South Lanarkshire
20th-century deaths from tuberculosis
Tuberculosis deaths in Scotland